Maxim Franţuz (born 4 May 1986, in Chișinău) is a Moldovan professional football player. As of September 2009, he plays for FC Zimbru Chişinău.

External links
 

1986 births
Living people
Moldovan footballers
Moldova international footballers
FC Zimbru Chișinău players
Association football midfielders